Cien años de perdón (English: To Steal from a Thief) is a Spanish-Argentine thriller film directed by Daniel Calparsoro and written by Jorge Guerricaechevarría. The film had its premiere on 3 March 2016 in Argentina and on 4 March 2016 in Spain.

Plot
A group of thieves led by El Uruguayo is set to rob a bank in Valencia. Their purpose is to steal as many safety boxes as possible and then flee through a dug tunnel that connects with an abandoned subway terminal. However, the press officer of the Prime Minister discovers the thieves are actually after politically compromising information deposited by Gonzalo Soriano, a former member of the government who is in a coma after a severe accident.

The gang's plans start to go awry as the tunnel is flooded by heavy rain, leaving them with little room for escape. The thieves were recruited by El Uruguayo under the impression this was a plain robbery. But later the heist members know the truth that he was contracted by the governing party to get a box from safe 314 where Soriano kept the data.

Things go further down the hole when Loco messes up twice, by deleting the data from the hard disk retrieved from 314 and under anxiety gives away their cover in an exit. El Gallego and El Uruguayo plan to use the hard disk as a leverage, even though its empty. They negotiate with Mellizo, Security Head from the Spanish secret services. Things don't seem to go well. Suddenly rain clears and the heist members, under the pretense of coming out through the front door using hostages, escape through the tunnel.

The bank manager, who was about to lose her job, is given diamonds by Gallego. Loco provides money stolen to a girl whom he is instantly smitten to solve her financial troubles. Every one from the team goes separate ways with their share. A police personnel involved with the negotiation leaks information to the press about Soriano's hard disk and the governing party's involvement.

Cast
Luis Tosar as El Gallego, a thief from Galicia.
Rodrigo de la Serna as El Uruguayo, a thief leader from Uruguay.
Raúl Arévalo as Ferrán, a political officer.
José Coronado as Mellizo, an intelligence officer.
Joaquín Furriel as Loco ("Crazy"), a junior thief.
Patricia Vico as Sandra, a bank branch director.
Marian Álvarez as Cristina
Luciano Cáceres as Varela, a thief.

Awards and nominations

See also
 The Bank Job, a 2008 British film with similar plot elements.

References

External links
 

Spanish thriller films
2016 films
Films about bank robbery
Films directed by Daniel Calparsoro
Films produced by Álvaro Augustin
Films produced by Ghislain Barrois
Films produced by Javier Ugarte
Morena Films films
Vaca Films films
Films set in Valencia
Telecinco Cinema films
2010s Spanish-language films